Statistics Botswana (StatsBots)  is the National statistical bureau of  Botswana. The organization was previously under the Ministry of Finance and development planning as a department and was called Central Statistics Office. The organisation was initially set up in 1967 through an Act of Parliament – the Statistics Act (Cap 17) and thereafter transformed into a parastatal through the revised Statistics Act of 2009. This act gives the Statistics Botswana the mandate and authority to  collect, process, compile, analyse, publish, disseminate and archive official national statistics. It is also responsible for "coordinating, monitoring and supervising the National Statistical System" in Botswana. The office has its main offices in Gaborone and three satellite offices  in Maun, Francistown and Ghanzi. The other statistics that are not  specified can be collected as long as they are required by the Government, stakeholders and the users.

Legal Mandate 
Statistics Botswana conducts the Population and Housing Census (PHC) within the jurisdiction of two (2) key legal instruments namely:

 Census Act (Cap 17:02) of 1904
 Statistics Act (Cap 17:01) of 2009 

The legal instruments  stipulates that the census population of Botswana should be carried out every 10 years and any other censuses and surveys as it is determined or necessary. The Statistics Act 2009 authorizes the Statistician General to have access to records (administrative data, financial, geographic information etc.) from other statistics producing agencies.

The Statistics Act 2009  provides for confidentiality and disclosure of information. All staff of Statistics Botswana, including any contractors of Statistics Botswana are sworn to secrecy to not disclose any information that they came across by virtue of their employment (Section 20) of the Act and penalties are also provided for in the Act. In addition, .

Data collection 
data collection is the process of gathering data for purposes of measuring information on variables of interest in an established systematic fashion that enables one to

answer stated research question, test hypothesis and evaluate outcomes.  Data is collected through various methods. The primary methods used by Statistics Botswana include questionnaires, face to face interviews, online interviews and desktop data collection.

Uses of Data 
Survey and census data  update the  demographic, social and economic data to support national development activities. The data also  is used for informed decision making in various government, private and  individual  activities  such as:

 Provision of data for constituency delimitation processes;
 Increase availability and accessibility of accurate, timely and reliable baseline data on demographic and socio-economic characteristics of the population;
 Provision of various demographic baseline indicators, such as current data for the determination of fertility, mortality and migration levels, patterns and trends, as well as population growth at national and sub-national levels; 
 Formulation of development policies and programs as well as tracking and monitoring socio-economic development, among others
 Interpretation and dissemination of population census data in a manner that will ensure effective application as well as an understanding of the population
 factors in national development evidence-based decision making, formulation of policies, programmes and projects;
 Strengthening national capacities in data collection, processing, analysis, dissemination and utilization, including Geographic Information System (GIS), as well as, census strategic planning and management.

Censuses and Surveys conducted 
SOCIAL  SURVEYS and CENSUSES

ECONOMIC  SURVEYS

Economic surveys are conducted monthly, quarterly, and yearly. They cover selected sectors of the country’s economy and supplement the economic census with more-frequent information about the dynamic economy. These surveys  produce publications that are shared in public domains for all to be informed.

Ongoing Surveys 
Quarterly Multi-Topic Survey (QMTS)
 Population and Housing Survey

Other  Statistics 
Statistics Botswana compiles and analyses economic statistics from administrative data and business surveys sources. The release of the key indicators varies in periodicity from monthly, quarterly or annually.

Gross Domestic Product

Consumer Price Statistics 
Annual Inflation Rate  2011 to 2021

Publications 
The statistical outputs released  include  microdata sets, survey reports, stats briefs and many others. The publications are available in the  official digital channels of the organisation which are;

https://www.statsbots.org.bw

https://botswana.opendataforafrica.org/

https://microdata.statsbots.org.bw

Statistics Botswana  produced  a special publication on "selected Statistical indicators: 1966-2016" as part and contribution to Botswana's 50th anniversary of independence celebrations.

See also                                                                                                  

 Botswana Communications Regulatory Authority
 Civil Aviation Authority of Botswana
 Directorate of Intelligence and Security

References

External links
 Official website
 2011 Census of Botswana

Government agencies of Botswana
Botswana